Ricardo Javier Tavarelli Paiva (born 2 August 1970) is a former Paraguayan footballer, who played as a goalkeeper.

Career
Tavarelli started his career in the youth divisions of Tacuary and then moved to the youth divisions of Club Olimpia, where he made his debut in the first team squad in 1992, playing the Torneo Republica. In Olimpia he would go on to win several national and international championships, becoming a fan-favorite. Tavarelli was a pivotal part of the 2002 Olimpia team that won the Copa Libertadores. His skills helped Olimpia win two key penalty shoot-outs against Grêmio of Porto Alegre (semi-finals) and São Caetano (finals). In 2004, he played for Grêmio of Brazil with little success. Tavarelli returned to Club Olimpia and also had a brief sting playing for Sportivo Luqueño before finally retiring. He earned the nickname "Mono" (monkey) because of his quick goalkeeping skills. He was also called "Lettuce Hands".

Tavarelli was also part of the Paraguay national team in the 2002 FIFA World Cup, playing the team's first two matches following the suspension of captain José Luis Chilavert prior to the tournament.

Tavarelli's sister, Giselle, is the wife of Paraguayan footballer Roque Santa Cruz.

Titles

References

1970 births
Living people
Paraguayan footballers
Club Olimpia footballers
Grêmio Foot-Ball Porto Alegrense players
Sportivo Luqueño players
Paraguayan Primera División players
Paraguay international footballers
1999 Copa América players
2001 Copa América players
2002 FIFA World Cup players
Paraguayan expatriate footballers
Expatriate footballers in Brazil
Paraguayan people of Italian descent
Association football goalkeepers